Jack Whyman (1924 or 1925 – 2011) was a British trade union leader.

Whyman joined the Amalgamated Engineering Union (AEU), and from the mid-1960s worked full-time for the union, focusing on negotiations in the aerospace, motor and engineering industries.  In the late 1970s, he was elected to the union's executive, representing London and the South East, on which he was associated with the right-wing of the union.

In 1983, the General Council of the Trades Union Congress was reorganised, with the AEU guaranteed four seats, and Whyman was given one of them.  Although he was dropped the following year, he was reappointed in 1985.  He was also prominent in the Confederation of Shipbuilding and Engineering Unions, serving as its president in 1989/90.  He retired from all his trade union posts in 1990, being replaced on the AEU's executive by the more radical Roger Butler.

References

1920s births
2011 deaths
English trade unionists
Members of the General Council of the Trades Union Congress